EgyptAir Flight 741 was a flight between Cairo International Airport and the now-defunct Nicosia International Airport that crashed on 29 January 1973. All 37 people on board died. It was the fourth accident, and the third with fatalities, involving the newly established EgyptAir.

The plane crashed in the Kyrenia mountain range in Cyprus on its descent while approaching the runway from the north. The black box of the aircraft was analyzed in Moscow.

Passengers

References

Aviation accidents and incidents in 1973
Aviation accidents and incidents in Cyprus
1973 in Egypt
1973 in Cyprus
Accidents and incidents involving the Ilyushin Il-18
741
January 1973 events in Europe
1973 disasters in Egypt
1973 disasters in Cyprus